The men's middleweight event was part of the boxing programme at the 1956 Summer Olympics.  The weight class was allowed boxers of up to 75 kilograms to compete. The competition was held from 26 November to 1 December 1956. 14 boxers from 14 nations competed.

Medalists

Results

First round
 Giulio Rinaldi (ITA) def. Jens Andersen (DEN), PTS
 Gennadi Shatkov (URS) def. Ralph Hosack (CAN), PTS
 Dieter Wemhöner (FRG) def. Ronald Redrup (GBR), PTS
 Victor Zalazar (ARG) def. Stig Sjölin (SWE), PTS
 Július Torma (CZE) def. Howard Richter (AUS), PTS
 Ramón Tapia (CHI) def. Zbigniew Piórkowski (POL), RSC-1

Quarterfinals
 Gilbert Chapron (FRA) def. Roger Rouse (USA), PTS
 Gennadi Shatkov (URS) def. Giulio Rinaldi (ITA), walk-over
 Victor Zalazar (ARG) def. Dieter Wemhöner (FRG), PTS
 Ramón Tapia (CHI) def. Július Torma (CZE), RSC-2

Semifinals
 Gennadi Shatkov (URS) def. Victor Zalazar (ARG), RTD-2
 Ramón Tapia (CHI) def. Gilbert Chapron (FRA), walk-over

Final
 Gennadi Shatkov (URS) def. Ramón Tapia (CHI), KO-1

References

 https://web.archive.org/web/20080912181829/http://www.la84foundation.org/6oic/OfficialReports/1956/OR1956.pdf

Middleweight